Almodóvar del Pinar is a municipality in Cuenca, Castile-La Mancha, Spain. It had a population of 393 .

References

Municipalities in the Province of Cuenca